A digital clock manager (DCM) is an electronic component available on some field-programmable gate arrays (FPGAs) (notably ones produced by Xilinx). A digital clock manager is useful for manipulating clock signals inside the FPGA, and to avoid clock skew which would introduce errors in the circuit.

Uses
Digital clock managers have the following applications:

 Multiplying or dividing an incoming clock (which can come from outside the FPGA or from a Digital Frequency Synthesizer [DFS]).
 Making sure the clock has a steady duty cycle.
 Adding a phase shift with the additional use of a delay-locked loop.
 Eliminating clock skew within an FPGA design.

See also
 Phase-locked loop

References 

Gate arrays
Electronic oscillators
Integrated circuits
Digital electronics
Electronic design